Roger Mayer is the name of:

Roger Mayer (engineer), British acoustic engineer
Roger Mayer (film industry executive) (1926–2015), American film industry executive